The Chesapeake Bay Bridge–Tunnel (CBBT, officially the Lucius J. Kellam Jr. Bridge–Tunnel) is a  bridge–tunnel that crosses the mouth of the Chesapeake Bay between Delmarva and Hampton Roads in the U.S. state of Virginia. It opened in 1964, replacing ferries that had operated since the 1930s. A major project to dualize its bridges was completed in 1999, and a similar project to dualize one of its tunnels is currently underway.

With  of bridges and two  tunnels, the CBBT is one of only 14 bridge–tunnel systems in the world and one of three in Hampton Roads. The bridge is the longest in terms of overall length in the United States to not be located in the state of Louisiana. , over 140 million vehicles have crossed the CBBT. 

The CBBT was built and is operated by the Chesapeake Bay Bridge and Tunnel District, a political subdivision of the Commonwealth of Virginia governed by the Chesapeake Bay Bridge and Tunnel Commission in cooperation with the Virginia Department of Transportation. Its construction was financed by toll revenue bonds, while operating and maintenance expenses are recovered through tolls. In 2002, a Joint Legislative Audit and Review Commission (JLARC) study commissioned by the Virginia General Assembly concluded that "given the inability of the state to fund future capital requirements of the CBBT, the District and Commission should be retained to operate and maintain the Bridge–Tunnel as a toll facility in perpetuity".

The CBBT is often confused with the similarly named Chesapeake Bay Bridge, which crosses the Chesapeake Bay farther north in Maryland in Annapolis, near the United States Naval Academy.

History

Geographic background
In December 1606, the Virginia Company of London sent an expedition to North America to establish a settlement in the Colony of Virginia. After sailing across the Atlantic Ocean from England, they reached the New World at the southern edge of the mouth of what is now known as the Chesapeake Bay. They named the two flanking Virginia points of land /capes like gateposts at the entrance to the long extensive estuary after the sons of their king, James I, the southern Cape Henry, for the eldest and presumed heir, Henry Frederick, Prince of Wales, and the northern Cape Charles, for his younger brother, Charles, Duke of York (the future King Charles I). A few weeks later they established their first permanent settlement on the southern, mainland, side of the bay, several miles upstream along the newly named James River at Jamestown on the northern shore on a close-in island for protection, the first permanent settlement in English North America.

Across the bay, the area north of Cape Charles was located along what became known later as the Delmarva Peninsula. As it bordered the Atlantic Ocean to its east, the region became known as Virginia and neighboring Maryland's Eastern Shore. As the entire colony grew, the bay was a formidable transportation obstacle for exchanges with the Virginia mainland on the Western Shore. One of the eight original shires of Virginia, Accomac Shire was established there in 1634, eventually becoming the two counties of modern times, Accomack County in the north and Northampton County to the south. In comparison to mainland regions, commerce and growth was limited by the need to cross the Bay. Consequently, little industrial base grew there, with the oceanfront peninsula staying predominantly rural with small towns and villages oriented towards life on the waters, and most residents made their living by farming and working as watermen, both on the bay (locally known as the "bay side") and in the Atlantic Ocean ("sea side").

Ferry system
For the first 350 years, ships and ferry systems provided the primary transportation.

From the early 1930s to 1954, the Virginia Ferry Corporation (VFC), a privately owned public service company managed a scheduled vehicular (car, bus, truck) and passenger ferry service between the Virginia Eastern Shore and Princess Anne County (now part of the City of Virginia Beach)  on the mainland Western Shore in the South Hampton Roads area. This system, connecting portions of US 13, was known as the Little Creek-Cape Charles Ferry.  In 1951, the northern terminus in Delmarva was relocated to a location now within Kiptopeke State Park.

Despite an expanded fleet of large and modern ships by the VFC in the 1940s and early 1950s which were eventually capable of as many as 90 one-way trips each day, the lengthy crossing suffered delays due to heavy traffic and inclement weather.

In 1954, the Virginia General Assembly created a political subdivision, the Chesapeake Bay Ferry District and its governing body, the Chesapeake Bay Ferry Commission. The commission was authorized to acquire the private ferry corporation through bond financing, to improve the existing VFC ferry service.

When the CBBT opened, much of the ferry equipment and vessels used by the Little Creek-Cape Charles Ferry VFC service was sold and moved north to be redeployed to start the Cape May–Lewes Ferry across the  mouth of the Delaware Bay between Cape May, New Jersey and Lewes, Delaware. It still serves transit needs, but the number of pleasure trip passengers increased as the coastal beach resorts developed and grew crowded with vacationers in the next decades, partly due to the improved swifter transportation with highway, bridge, and tunnel access in the region of three states.

Studying a fixed crossing

In 1956, the General Assembly authorized the Ferry Commission to conduct feasibility studies for the construction of a fixed crossing. The conclusion of the study indicated that a vehicular crossing was feasible.

Consideration was given to service between the Eastern Shore and both the peninsula and South Hampton Roads. Eventually, the shortest route, extending between the Eastern Shore and a point in Princess Anne County at Chesapeake Beach (east of Little Creek, west of Lynnhaven Inlet), was selected. An option to also provide a fixed crossing link to Hampton and the peninsula was not pursued.

The selected route crosses two Atlantic shipping channels: the Thimble Shoals Channel to Hampton Roads and the Chesapeake Channel to the northern Chesapeake Bay. High-level bridges were initially considered for traversing these channels. The United States Navy objected to bridging the Thimble Shoals Channel because a bridge collapse (possibly by sabotage) could cut Naval Station Norfolk off from the Atlantic Ocean. Maryland officials expressed similar concerns about the Chesapeake Channel and the Port of Baltimore.

To address these concerns, the engineers recommended a series of bridges and tunnels known as a bridge–tunnel, similar in design to the Hampton Roads Bridge–Tunnel, which had been completed in 1957, but a considerably longer and larger facility. The tunnel portions, anchored by four man-made islands of approximately  each, would be extended under the two main shipping channels. The CBBT was designed by the engineering firm Sverdrup & Parcel of St. Louis, Missouri.

Original construction

In mid-1960, the Chesapeake Bay Ferry Commission sold $200 million in toll revenue bonds (equivalent to $ billion in  dollars) to private investors, and the proceeds were used to finance the construction of the bridge–tunnel. Funds collected by future tolls were pledged to pay the principal and interest on the bonds. No local, state, or federal tax funds were used in the construction of the project.

Construction contracts were awarded to a consortium of Tidewater Construction Corporation and  Merritt-Chapman & Scott Corporation. The steel superstructure for the high-level bridges near the north end of the crossing were fabricated by the American Bridge Division of United States Steel Corporation. Construction of the bridge–tunnel began in October 1960 after a six-month process of assembling necessary equipment from worldwide sources.

The tunnels were constructed using the technique refined by Ole Singstad with the Baltimore Harbor Tunnel, whereby a large ditch was first dug for each tunnel, into which was lowered pre-fabricated tunnel sections cable-suspended from overhead barges. Interior chambers were filled with water to lower the sections, the sections then aligned, bolted together by divers, the water pumped out, and the tunnels finally covered with earth.

The construction was accomplished under the severe conditions imposed by nor'easters, hurricanes, and the unpredictable Atlantic Ocean. During the Ash Wednesday Storm of 1962, much of the partially completed work and a major piece of custom-built equipment, a pile driver barge called "The Big D",  were destroyed. Seven workers were killed at various times during the construction. In April 1964, 42 months after construction began, the Chesapeake Bay Bridge–Tunnel opened to traffic and the ferry service discontinued.

The Ferry Commission and transportation district it oversees, created in 1954, were later renamed for the revised mission of building and operating the Chesapeake Bay Bridge–Tunnel. The CBBT district is a public agency, and it is a legal subdivision of the Commonwealth of Virginia. The bridge–tunnel is supported financially by the tolls collected from the motorists who use the facility.

Eastern Shore native, businessman, and civic leader Lucius J. Kellam Jr. (1911–1995) was the original commission's first chairman. In a commentary at the time of his death in 1995, the Norfolk-based Virginian-Pilot newspaper recalled that Kellam had been involved in bringing the multimillion-dollar bridge–tunnel project from dream to reality.

Before it was built, Kellam handled a political fight over the location, and addressed concerns of the U.S. Navy about prospective hazards to navigation to and from the Norfolk Navy Base at Sewell's Point.

Kellam was also directly involved in the negotiations to finance the ambitious crossing with bonds. According to the newspaper article, "there were not-unfounded fears that (1) storm-driven seas and drifting or off-course vessels could damage, if not destroy, the span and (2) traffic might not be sufficient to service the entire debt in an orderly way. Sure enough, bridge portions of the crossing have occasionally been damaged by vessels, and there was a long period when holders of the riskiest bonds received no interest on their investment."

An icon of eastern Virginia politics, Kellam remained chairman and champion of the CBBT throughout the hard times, and the bondholders were eventually paid as toll revenues caught up with expenses. He continued to serve until he was over 80 years old, finally retiring in 1993. He had held the post for 39 years.

The facility was renamed in Kellam's honor in 1987, over 20 years after it opened.

Bridge dualization (1999)

At a cost of $197 million, new parallel two-lane trestles were built both to alleviate traffic and for safety reasons. Immediately after completion of the parallel trestles, traffic was diverted to them and the original trestles and roadway underwent a $20 million retrofit, repairing the wear and tear of 35 years of service and upgrading certain features, such as repaving the road surface. The older portion of the facility was then reopened on April 19, 1999.

The 1995–1999 project increased the capacity of the above-water portion of the facility to four lanes, added wider shoulders for the new southbound portion, facilitated needed repairs, and provided protection against a total closure should a trestle be struck by a ship or otherwise damaged (which had occurred twice in the past); partially for this reason, the parallel trestles are not located immediately adjacent to each other, reducing the chance that both would be damaged during a single incident.

Thimble Shoal Tunnel dualization (projected 2027)

In 2013, the CBBT Commission approved a project to construct a second tunnel under the Thimble Shoal channel for an estimated cost of $756 million. The project received three bids, all of which would use a tunnel boring machine. At that rate, it was estimated that the tunnel would be dug within about one year. Construction work began in 2017 to prepare the location of the tunnels. The affected pier, shop, and restaurant were closed in September 2017. The machine was built in 2018, after some delays, and was shipped to Virginia. After boring, the machine will also be adding the circular concrete segments which will be delivered into the tunnel via mine cars one at a time. Construction was scheduled to finish in 2023. By August 2022, the second tunnel at Thimble Shoal had been delayed to 2027.

 Tunnel length: approximately 
 Tunnel diameter:
 Inner diameter: 
 Outer diameter: 
 Construction cost: $755,987,318
 Construction method: Bored tunnel
 Construction start (estimate): October 1, 2017
 Construction completion (estimate): 2023
 Maximum tunnel depth
 Concrete sections: The tunnel will consist of approximately 9,000 individual concrete pieces. Approximately  of concrete will be needed to make the tunnel sections.

Chesapeake Channel Tunnel dualization (projected 2035–2040)

At the northern end, a parallel Chesapeake Channel Tunnel will be added to finish the entire length to become a four-lane highway from shore to shore. This project is marked to begin in 2035, which would possibly be open for traffic in 2040, assuming there are no setbacks or delays.

In 2021, the United States Department of Transportation loaned $338.6 million to the Chesapeake Bay Bridge Tunnel District through the Transportation Infrastructure Finance and Innovation Act, with funds provided by the Infrastructure Investment and Jobs Act. The loan would help pay for the construction of both parallel tunnels.

Operations, maintenance, and regulations

Toll collection facilities are located at both ends of the facility. Tolls are paid in each direction. As of 2019, the toll for cars (without trailers) traveling along the CBBT is $14 for off-peak or $18 for peak times (Friday through Sunday from May 15 to September 15). Should a car make a return trip within 24 hours of the first, the second trip across costs $6/$2 for off peak/peak season, but only with an EZ-Pass; cash or card payers must pay full fare. Motorcycles pay the same toll as cars without trailers. All other vehicles are charged based on size and purpose and are not subject to the return-trip discount. All tolls must be paid either in cash, debit/credit card, by scrip tickets issued by the CBBT, or via E-ZPass electronic toll collection.  The bridge–tunnel began accepting Smart Tag/E-ZPass payments on November 1, 2007.

All toll lanes including E-ZPass-only lanes are gated for safety concerns and to turn around inadmissible vehicles. For example:
 Strong winds have blown over certain vehicles. Therefore, some vehicles are banned when the wind speed exceeds . Level 6 wind restrictions with hurricane-force winds (at least , i.e., approaching the wind speed of a Category 1 hurricane, which is at least ), and other inclement weather conditions ban all traffic.
 Hazardous materials and compressed gas require various restrictions and inspections to safeguard the tunnels.
An over-height truck in April 2007 severely damaged the tunnels. Repairs took three weeks.
 Should police activities, accidents, or closures stop traffic from moving freely, gates prevent drivers from entering and then being forced to either back up within the narrow space or to wait too long in the middle of the bridge–tunnel.

The bridge–tunnel management prohibits bicycles but offers a shuttle van for $15. Cyclists must call ahead.

It is mandatory that the bridge be checked and serviced every five years. Since servicing the bridge takes about five years, the process is a continuous cycle.

The CBBT is one of only two automobile transportation facilities in Virginia with its own police department; the other is the Richmond Metropolitan Authority Toll Road Police. By original charter from the state, it has authority to enforce the laws of Virginia. Emergency call boxes are spaced at half-mile (0.8 km) intervals.

Tourism

The CBBT promotes the bridge–tunnel as not only a transportation facility to tourist destinations to the north and south, but as a destination itself. Unlike the Interstate Highways that travelers would avoid by taking the bridge–tunnel, the roads in the shortcut have traffic lights.

On the Delmarva peninsula to the north of the bridge, travelers may visit nearby Kiptopeke State Park, Eastern Shore National Wildlife Refuge, Fisherman Island National Wildlife Refuge (closed to the public), Assateague Island National Seashore, NASA's Wallops Flight Facility, campgrounds and other vacation destinations. To the south are tourist destinations around Virginia Beach, including First Landing State Park, Norfolk Botanical Garden, Virginia Beach Maritime Historical Museum, Atlantic Wildfowl Heritage Museum, and the Virginia Aquarium and Maritime Science Center.

A scenic overlook is located at the north end of the bridge and was formerly located at South Thimble Island, near the south end. At South Thimble Island, passing ships may include U.S. Navy warships, nuclear submarines, and aircraft carriers, as well as large cargo vessels and sailing ships. A restaurant and gift shop on the island opened in 1964, along with the  Sea Gull Pier. Bluefish, trout, croaker, flounder, and other species have been caught from the pier. Since birds use the habitat created by the bridges and islands of the CBBT, birders have travelled to the bridge–tunnel to see them at South Thimble Island and the scenic overlook at the north end. As part of the Thimble Shoal Channel Tunnel twinning, the building housing the restaurant and gift shop closed and access to the pier was prohibited starting at the end of September 2017. The building will be demolished and not replaced, and the pier will reopen to the public at the end of the project in 2022.

Dimensions
Among the key features of the Chesapeake Bay Bridge–Tunnel are two  tunnels beneath the Thimble Shoals and Chesapeake navigation channels and two pairs of side-by-side high-level bridges over two other navigation channels: North Channel Bridge ( clearance) and Fisherman Inlet Bridge ( clearance). The remaining portion comprises  of low-level trestle,  of causeway, and four man-made islands.

Between North Channel and Fisherman Inlet, the facility crosses at grade over Fisherman Island, a barrier island that is part of the Eastern Shore of Virginia National Wildlife Refuge administered by the U.S. Fish and Wildlife Service.

The columns that support the CBBT's trestles—called piles—would stretch for about  if placed end-to-end, roughly the distance between New York City and Philadelphia.

Incidents 
The CBBT has been closed three times for multiple days after being struck by watercraft:
 In December 1967, coal barge Mohawk broke anchor and struck the bridge, closing it for two weeks for repairs.
 On January 21, 1970, the USS Yancey (AKA-93), a United States Navy attack cargo ship carrying 250 people, was at anchor near the bridge–tunnel. There were no vehicles on the bridge at the time of the impact, and no one was injured. During the 42 days it took to replace the damaged span, the Navy offered a free shuttle service for commuters using helicopters and LCUs.
 In 1972, the bridge was again impacted by a barge that had broken loose, closing it for two weeks while the span was repaired.

Other, less significant strikes have caused shorter closures while the affected structures are inspected—most recently, a four hour closure after a barge strike in June 2011.

, there have been 16 incidents of vehicles running off the bridge and into the water. In 2017, a truck plowed through the barriers into the sea below; the driver was rescued but died en route to the hospital. In December 2020, a dairy truck crashed through the guardrail near mile 14. Witnesses saw the driver drifting in the water—estimated to be about —but were unable to rescue him. A second truck following the dairy truck encountered strong wind gusts just prior to the accident that blew it into the other lane.

See also

 List of bridge–tunnels
 Øresund Bridge
 Tokyo Bay Aqua-Line
 Busan–Geoje Fixed Link
 Hong Kong–Zhuhai–Macau Bridge

Notes

References

External links

 
 information from Norfolk Convention and Visitors Bureau
 Virginian-Pilot newspaper commentary on long-time CBBT Chairman Lucius J. Kellam Jr. at the time of his death in 1995
 Fisherman's Island National Wildlife Refuge, U.S. Fish and Wildlife Service
 General Assembly JLARC study of the CBBT in 2002

Chesapeake Bay
Bridges completed in 1964
Bridges completed in 1999
Toll bridges in Virginia
Toll tunnels in Virginia
Bridge–tunnels in North America
Cross-sea traffic ways in North America
U.S. Route 13
Buildings and structures in Virginia Beach, Virginia
Transportation in Virginia Beach, Virginia
Transportation in Northampton County, Virginia
Tunnels completed in 1964
Road bridges in Virginia
Road tunnels in Virginia
Immersed tube tunnels in the United States
Bridges of the United States Numbered Highway System
Steel bridges in the United States
Trestle bridges in the United States
1964 establishments in Virginia